John Stryker "Tilt" Meyer (born 1946) is an American author and U.S. Army Special Forces combat veteran of service in covert reconnaissance with the Studies and Observations Group, also known as MACV-SOG.  Meyer has published three works of nonfiction related to his experiences in the Vietnam War; the  first was Across the Fence: The Secret War in Vietnam published in 2003.

Early life and education
Meyer attended Trenton State College, but did not take higher education seriously and flunked out after two years. He then got a job at Yosemite National Park until he enlisted in the Army in May 1966.

Military career
Meyer enlisted in the U.S. Army in 1967. He was accepted into the United States Army Airborne School and became airborne qualified. Meyer completed basic training at Ft. Dix, N.J., advanced infantry training at Ft. Gordon, Ga., jump school at Ft. Benning, Ga., and graduated from the Special Forces Qualification Course in Dec. 1967, earning his Green Beret.

As U.S. involvement in the Vietnam War escalated, the United States began deploying Special Forces  "A-teams" (Operational Detachment Alpha, or ODA, teams) to Southeast Asia in support of counterinsurgency operations against the Viet Cong, North Vietnamese and other Communist forces. 

A Green Beret, Meyer joined MACVSOG, signing a 20-year secrecy agreement, and served two tours of duty in 1968 and 1969 running missions in Vietnam and "across the fence" in Laos and Cambodia. 

He arrived at FOB 1 Phu Bai in May 1968, where he joined Spike Team Idaho, which transferred to Command & Control North (CCN) in Da Nang January 1969. He began as the One-Two (Recon Team Radio Operator), and later became the One-Zero (Recon Team Leader, American) of ST Idaho until April 1969. 

At the end of his first tour, Meyer returned to the U.S. and was assigned to E Company in the 10th Special Forces Group at Ft. Devens, Mass. until October 1969, when he rejoined RT Idaho at CCN for his second tour, which ended in April 1970.

Career
Upon ending his two tours of duty in Vietnam, Meyer completed his college education at Trenton State College, where he was editor of The Signal school newspaper for two years. He worked at the Trenton Times for ten years, the San Diego Union Tribune for eight years, and The North County Times for 15 years before focusing his efforts entirely on the veterans community at two separate non-profits.

Meyer served as President for the Special Operations Association in 2011–2014. He also served as President of the Special Forces Association Chapter 78 in 2018–2019, and as an associate director in the veterans department at Interfaith Community Services, a non-profit org that focuses on supporting homeless veterans. 

Meyer was a board member of VANC (Veterans Association of North San Diego County and was Co-Chairman of One VA-CAB (Veterans Association Community Advocacy Board) in San Diego from 2016–2020. He also has memberships in the following: VFW, American Legion, United Veterans Council, and the San Diego Veterans Coalition.  

In addition to his continued work as an author, speaker, and veterans advocate, Meyer also hosts SOGCast, a podcast featuring untold stories of MACVSOG and those of fellow Green Berets and Special Forces operators.

Awards and decorations
  Combat Infantryman Badge
  Parachutist Badge (United States)
  Army Commendation Ribbon
  Army Air Medal
  National Defense Service Medal
  Vietnam Service Medal
  Vietnam Campaign Medal
  Presidential Unit Citation (United States) 2001, Studies and Observations Group
 Vietnam Gallantry Cross Unit Citation 
  Army Special Forces Tab
  
  Army Special Forces Command Distinctive Unit Insignia 
  Purple Heart
  Two Bronze Stars with "V" devices for Valor

Publications

Books
 Across the Fence: The Secret War in Vietnam (2003) .
 On the Ground the Secret War in Vietnam, with John E. Peters (2007). . .
 SOG Chronicles: Volume One .

Articles
Meyer wrote articles for Robert K. Brown in Soldier of Fortune magazine under a nom de guerre. He also wrote articles for SOFREP.

See also
Studies and Observations Group
Billy Waugh
Robert L. Howard

References

1946 births
Living people
American memoirists
United States Army personnel of the Vietnam War
American military writers
Members of the United States Army Special Forces
Military personnel from New Jersey
Writers from Trenton, New Jersey
The College of New Jersey alumni
United States Army soldiers
Recipients of the Air Medal